Deh-e Bala (also Romanized as Deh-e Bālā; also known as Dehbālā Bīdkhān) is a village in Mashiz Rural District, in the Central District of Bardsir County, Kerman Province, Iran. At the 2006 census, its population was 887, in 219 families.

References 

Populated places in Bardsir County